Jerome de Prado (1547 – 13 January 1595) was a Spanish Jesuit Biblical scholar and exegete who interpreted the Book of Ezekiel.

Life and works
Prado was born in Baeza, Spain.  He entered the Society of Jesus in 1572; taught literature; and then filled the chair of scripture at Cordoba, Spain for sixteen years. His magnum opus was the Tomus Primus in Ezechiel (fol. pp. 360; Rome, 1596). After sixteen years spent on this tome he died in Rome, where he was seeking illustrations for it. He had reached the twenty-sixth chapter. The remainder of Ezekiel was interpreted by the Jesuit John Baptist Villalpando, of Cordoba, who added two volumes. Of these the second is in two parts: I. Explanationum Ezechielis prophetæ, pars prima, in tredecim capita sequentia (fol. pp. 104; Rome, 1604); II. De postrema Ezechielis prophetæ visione (fol. pp. 655; Rome, 1605). This second part of the second volume goes into a detailed archæological study of the Temple of Jerusalem. The third volume of this commentary on Ezekiel is entitled Appartus urbis ac templi Hierosolymitani (folio, pp. xvi, 603; Rome, 1604). There are two parts to the volume, and both are the joint work of Prado and Villalpando.

Commentaries on Isaiah, Zachary, Micah, and the Epistle to the Hebrews, as well as a book on biblical chronology, are among the manuscripts left by Prado, several of which are in the National Library of Madrid. The volumes published by Villalpando were dedicated to Philip II of Spain, at whose request and cost the work begun by Prado was brought to a successful completion. These three volumes include a thorough and scientific study of Jewish coins, weights, and measures; and a reconstruction of the Temple and the City of Jerusalem from the very few data at hand. Cardinal Nicholas Wiseman found the work of Prado to be "still the greatest repertory to which every modern scholiast must recur, in explaining the difficulties of the book". The younger Rosenmüller calls these volumes "a work replete with varied erudition, and most useful to the study of antiquity". Among those whom Prado inspired with his thoroughness and enthusiasm in the study of the Bible were his pupils John Pineda and Luis de Alcazar.

Notes

References
 cites:
Hurter, Nomenclator, I (Innsbruck, 1892), 84;
Carlos Sommervogel, Bibliothèque de la Compagnie de Jésus, VI, 1149.

1547 births
1595 deaths
16th-century Spanish Jesuits
Spanish biblical scholars